Jamie Barrow (born 1993) is a British snowboarder. In 2018, at the speed of 93.2 mph, he broke the Guinness World Record for the fastest speed on a snowboard while being towed by a vehicle (a Maserati Levante) in St. Moritz, Switzerland. In 2022,  Barrow broke his record for the fastest speed on a snowboard while being towed by a vehicle (an Audi e-tron GT) with a two-way average of 117.15 mph and a top speed of 131.11 mph.

In 2022 emails between Barrow and zipline manufacturing company Terra Nova were featured in several news articles about the death of a zipline guide at Stowe Mountain Resort, which is owned by Vail Resorts. The employee was killed after a lanyard connecting him to the zipline at Stowe failed and emails showed that Barrow, who was working as the Director of Operations Training and Risk Management for Vail Resorts, had previously argued against Terra Nova's recommendation of replacing the zip lanyards on an annual basis.  The Vermont Occupational Safety and Health Administration found that the employee "would not have been killed if the primary attachment lanyard had been replaced." and fined Vail $27,306.

References

Living people
British male snowboarders
1993 births
21st-century British people